The 2012 Team Long Track World Championship was the sixth annual FIM Team Long Track World Championship. The final took place on 23 June 2012 in Saint-Macaire, France.

Results
  Saint-Macaire
 23 June 2012

See also
 2012 Individual Long Track World Championship
 2012 Speedway World Cup

References

Team Long Track World Championship